David Sims (born 1966) is a British fashion photographer who first made his name in the early 1990s with magazines such as The Face and i-D.

Commercial career
Sims was born in Sheffield. He worked first as a photographer's assistant with Robert Erdmann and Norman Watson. He was taken on by a photography agency and his work began to feature in editorial pages of magazines such as i-D, The Face Vogue and Arena Homme Plus. He has also worked in advertising, creating images for brands such as Alexander McQueen, Balenciaga, Calvin Klein, Jil Sander and Yohji Yamamoto.

Exhibitions
International exhibitions of Sims' work have been held at the Museum of Contemporary Art Tokyo, Fotomuseum Winterthur, Switzerland and Deichtorhallen in Hamburg.

The Institute of Contemporary Arts (ICA), London featured Sims’ work in spring 2013, his first solo show in the United Kingdom in 15 years.

Collections
His work is held in the permanent collections of London's Victoria and Albert Museum (V&A) and Tate Modern.

Awards
Sims was named young fashion photographer of the year twice (1994 and 1996) at the Hyères International Fashion and Photography Festival.

Personal life
Sims once lived in Cornwall with his partner, the fashion designer Luella Bartley. They now live in London.

References

External links
 
 David Sims at Models.com

1966 births
Living people
Photographers from Yorkshire
Fashion photographers
Artists from Sheffield